Richard Pearse Airport , also known as Timaru Airport, is located off the Pleasant Point Highway, 4 km north of the suburb Washdyke in Timaru, New Zealand.

History
The airport takes its name from the local pioneer aviator, Richard Pearse, who allegedly flew in powered flight before the Wright Brothers. The airport is a small regional airport with one gate, one asphalt runway and two grass runways. The South Canterbury Aero Club is based at the airport and frequently uses the airport for training and recreational purposes.

There are regular Air New Zealand Link flights to Wellington using Bombardier Q300 aircraft, formerly flights were operated to Oamaru and Christchurch. Timaru, is the only major centre without a direct air service to Auckland. Eagle Airways used to operate from Timaru to Wellington with Beechcraft 1900D aircraft.

Upgrade
A $1.3 million upgrade was approved in November 2015 by the Timaru District Council. The upgrade would increase the current terminal space from 450 square metres to cover almost 600 square metres and would include a new luggage collection area. The upgrade was in response to the increase in capacity on Air New Zealand Link flights to Wellington using the higher capacity Bombardier Q300.

Airlines and destinations

See also

 List of airports in New Zealand
 List of airlines of New Zealand
 Transport in New Zealand

References

External links

Richard Pearse Airport at  Timaru District Council

Airports in New Zealand
Timaru
Buildings and structures in Canterbury, New Zealand
Transport in Canterbury, New Zealand
Transport buildings and structures in Canterbury, New Zealand